= Mtwalume River =

Coordinates: 30°29′04″S 30°38′03″E

The Mtwalume River is in KwaZulu-Natal, South Africa. The river arises near Highflats, and has the tributaries Mgeni and Quhu.
